13: Fear Is Real is an American horror reality competition series which premiered on January 7, 2009. It follows a group of 13 contestants as they are trying to survive in a setting inspired by horror movies.

On May 27, 2009, The CW canceled the series after one season.

About the show
13: Fear Is Real was produced by Magic Molehill Productions, Inc. and Warner Horizon Television Inc. in association with Jay Bienstock Productions and Ghost House Pictures with executive producers Jay Bienstock (Survivor, The Apprentice), Sam Raimi (the Spider-Man films, the Evil Dead films) and Robert Tapert (the Evil Dead films, The Grudge films).

The show involved 13 people competing against each other to avoid elimination in situations utilising their "deepest fears". The 13 will face shocking surprises, psychological scares and many "beware of the dark" moments, all designed by a "mastermind" of terror. In addition to frightening them, he will also entice individuals to work in concert with him and against the others, creating a situation in which the 13 will not only look over their shoulders but will also never be certain who is real before them. Each week, one or two unlucky victims will be "killed off" via frightening challenges and game-playing until only one person is left to win the grand prize of—fittingly—$66,666.

Challenges
Each round of the game consisted of two challenges: a "ritual" and an "execution ceremony."

Rituals
"Rituals" were challenges designed to prey on players' deepest fears. They were played either as two-player teams or as individuals. In team rituals, if there is an odd number of players, one sits out and is granted immunity for that round.

The ritual was set up so that either one team or two individual players would fail the challenge. The two players that failed the challenge were "condemned" to the "execution ceremony."

Execution Ceremonies
The "execution ceremony" was an elimination challenge normally played between the two players that failed the "ritual." If the current "killer" was successfully accused, they would also participate in the execution ceremony, as would any player who falsely accused another player of being the "killer."

Normally, the execution ceremony would consist of the players racing to escape a death trap of some sort. If a player successfully escaped, they would return to the game. The last player still in the death trap will be "killed" and eliminated from the game.

Prior to the execution ceremony, players would record "last words" on video as a farewell to the group in case they lost. The player who was "killed off" would have their video viewed by the rest of the group.

The Death Box

The death box was introduced the day after the contestants arrived. It was able to kill off a total of three players. Whoever had the death box became the "killer" and could kill off any other player at any time other than during a challenge. Any player who was killed off by the death box was eliminated from the game immediately, without any chance to give any last words. A bloody glove would be left on the bed of any player who was killed off by the death box.

Possessing the death box posed a risk to the killer. If another player believed that a particular player held it, they could accuse that player of being the killer. In that situation, all of the remaining players had to decide whether they agreed with the accusation. If so, the accusation would stand, and if correct, the killer would have to surrender the death box and would be sent to the execution ceremony.

Accusing another player of being the killer itself carried a risk. If the accusation was false, the accuser would then be sent to the execution ceremony.

If a player was killed off while in possession of the death box and it still had one or more uses remaining, it would be re-introduced to the game prior to the next ritual.

Contestants

: In episode 1, Rodney found the death box and became the killer.
: In episode 2, Nasser falsely accused Laura of possessing the death box, and was forced into the execution ceremony and did not take part in the ritual. As there was an odd number for the ritual, Erica sat out and got immunity.
: In episode 6, Erica found the death box and became the killer.
: In episode 8, Nasser found the death box and became the killer.

 The contestant won 13: Fear is Real, and claimed The $66,666 prize from The Mastermind.
 The contestant was "condemned" into the execution ceremony and was at risk of being “killed off”, but won the task this saving themselves from being executed.
 The contestant lost the execution ceremony and was eliminated and "killed off".
 The contestant was "killed off" by the contestant who is in possession of the death box.
 The contestant was immune from the execution ceremony.

Episodes

References

External links
 Official website (via Internet Archive)
 

2009 American television series debuts
2009 American television series endings
2000s American reality television series
English-language television shows
The CW original programming
Television series by Warner Horizon Television
Television series created by Sam Raimi